Derek Paul Dickenson (born 4 December 1949 in North Shields, Northumberland) is an English retired male hammer thrower.

Athletics career
Dickenson represented the United Kingdom at two consecutive Summer Olympics, starting in 1976 (Montreal). His best Olympic result was finishing in 14th place at the 1976 Summer Olympics, throwing 68.52 metres. He represented England in the hammer throw event, at the 1978 Commonwealth Games in Edmonton, Alberta, Canada. Four years later he represented England in the hammer throw, at the 1982 Commonwealth Games in Brisbane, Queensland, Australia.

Personal life
A former schoolteacher, Dickenson worked in local government and the private sector before starting with BBC television. He has commentated on every Olympic Games Winter and Summer since 1992. Best known for his commentary work on athletics he has also worked on Basketball, Volleyball, Weightlifting, Canoe Slalom, Yachting, Bobsleigh, Skeleton, Luge, Cross Country Skiing, Speed Skating and Ski Jumping.

Personal bests

References

 sports-reference
 BBC Reference
 Master of the University honoris causa
 Sporting Heroes & Photo
 Gameshow commentary
 

1949 births
Living people
English male hammer throwers
Olympic athletes of Great Britain
Athletes (track and field) at the 1976 Summer Olympics
Athletes (track and field) at the 1980 Summer Olympics
Commonwealth Games competitors for England
Athletes (track and field) at the 1978 Commonwealth Games
Athletes (track and field) at the 1982 Commonwealth Games
Sportspeople from North Shields
Track and field broadcasters
BBC sports presenters and reporters